Jordan Cox (27 May 1992 – 30 April 2020) was an English rugby league footballer who last played for Doncaster.

He had also played in the Super League for the Hull Kingston Rovers, the Huddersfield Giants and the Warrington Wolves. He had also appeared for Newcastle Thunder, Halifax and the Sheffield Eagles outside of the Super League.

Career

Cox made his first team debut for the Hull Kingston Rovers on 8 May 2011 away to York City Knights, in the  2011 Challenge Cup. On his début he looked confident and managed to get himself onto the scoresheet twice, after making his debut in the Challenge Cup he then went on to make a further 6 appearances in the Super League competition, earning himself a call up to the England Knights squad, which he later had to pull out of for post-season surgery.

At the start of the 2012 season, Cox played in 8 of the first 12 games earning himself a regular spot in the Hull Kingston Rovers starting 17, until the beginning of May.
When during an U20s game, his spleen ruptured causing him to miss 3 months of the season. However, although it was initially thought of as a season-ending injury, he quickly progressed through the rest and rehab stages and later made his comeback against the Bradford Bulls.

Between 2013 and 2015 Cox played for Newcastle Thunder, Halifax and the Huddersfield Giants on loan. After being signed, he made 18 appearances for the Warrington Wolves; again in the Super League.

Cox penned a one-year deal with Championship outfit Sheffield Eagles in January 2017. After playing 9 games in 2017 for the Sheffield Eagles, Cox joined League 1 side York City Knights on loan until the end of the season. He scored on his debut for them in a 28-18 home victory against Workington Town. At the end of the season Cox was released by the Sheffield Eagles.

Personal life
Cox died at his home in Hull on 30 April 2020, aged 27. No cause of death was made public at the time of his death, but the circumstances were described as "non-suspicious".  An inquest in January 2021 was informed that death was due to an accidental drug overdose.

References

1992 births
2020 deaths
Drug-related deaths in England
English rugby league players
Halifax R.L.F.C. players
Huddersfield Giants players
Hull Kingston Rovers players
Newcastle Thunder players
Rugby league players from Kingston upon Hull
Rugby league props
Sheffield Eagles players
Warrington Wolves players
York City Knights players